Vedea is a commune located in Giurgiu County, Muntenia, Romania. It is composed of a single village, Vedea. It also included Malu village until 2003, when it was split off to form Malu Commune.

References

External links 

Communes in Giurgiu County
Localities in Muntenia
Populated places on the Danube